Bryan Silva Maldonado (born 6 February 1999) is a Mexican footballer who plays as a forward for Sporting Canamy on loan from Pumas de la UNAM.

References

Living people
1999 births
Association football forwards
Club Universidad Nacional footballers
Sporting Canamy footballers
Liga MX players
Liga Premier de México players
Tercera División de México players
Footballers from the State of Mexico
Mexican footballers